This is a list of cities, towns and villages in the county of Cumbria, England.

A
Abbeytown, Ackenthwaite, Adgarley, Aglionby
Aiketgate, Aikhead, Aikshaw, Aikton, Ainstable, Aisgill
Albyfield, Aldingham, Aldoth, Allenwood
Allhallows, Allithwaite, Allonby
Alston, Alston Moor
Ambleside
Angerton, Allerdale, Angerton, South Lakeland, Annaside, Anthorn
Appleby-in-Westmorland, Applethwaite
Arkleby, Arlecdon, Armaside, Armathwaite
Arnaby, Arnside, Arrad Foot, Arthuret, Asby
Ashgill, Askam-in-Furness, Askham, Askerton
Aspatria, Aughertree, Ayside

B
Backbarrow, Baggrow, Baldwinholme, Bampton, Bampton Grange
Bandrake Head, Banks, Barber Green, Barbon
Barclose, Bardsea, Barepot, Barras
Barrow Island, Barrow-in-Furness
Barrows Green, Barton
Bassenthwaite
Baycliff, Bayles, Beanthwaite, Beaumont
Beck Bottom, Beck Foot, Beck Head, Beck Side
Beckces, Beckermet, Beckfoot, Beckside
Beetham, Belah, Belle Vue, Berrier, Bewaldeth
Bewcastle
Biggar, Biglands, Bigrigg
Birkby, Birkerthwaite
Black Combe, Blackbeck, Blackdyke, Blackford
Blackpool Gate, Blackwell
Blagill, Blawith, Bleatarn, Blencarn, Blencogo, Blencow, Blennerhasset, 
Blindbothel, Blindcrake, Blitterlees
Bolton, Bolton Low Houses, Bolton New Houses, Bolton Wood Lane, Boltongate,
Bomby, Bonning Gate, Boot, Bootle
Borrowdale, Borrowdale (Westmorland), Botcherby, Bothel, Boustead Hill
Bouth, Bowland Bridge, Bowmanstead, Bowness-on-Solway
Bowness-on-Windermere, Bowscale, Bowston, Brackenber, Brackenlands, Brackenthwaite (near Wigton), Brackenthwaite (near Cockermouth), Braithwaite
Brampton (Carlisle), Brampton (Eden)
Brandlingill, Bransty, Branthwaite
Brathay, Braystones, Brayton Park, Bretherdale Head
Bridekirk, Bridge Field, Bridgefoot, Briery
Brigham, Brigsteer
Brisco, Briscoe
Broad Oak, Broadwath, Brockleymoor
Bromfield, Broom, Brothybeck
Brough, Brough Sowerby, Brougham
Broughton, Broughton Beck, Broughton Cross
Broughton East, Broughton-in-Furness, Broughton Mills
Broughton Moor, Broughton West
Brownber, Browtop, Brunstock, Brunthwaite
Buckabank, Bullgill
Burgh by Sands, Burneside, Burnrigg, Burrells, Burtholme
Burthwaite, Burton-in-Kendal, Busk
Buttermere, Butterwick

C
Caldbeck, Calder, Calder Bridge, Calthwaite, Calva
Cambeck Bridge, Camerton, Canal Foot
Cardew, Cardewlees, Cardurnock, Cargo, Cark
Carlatton, Carleton (Carlisle), Carleton (Copeland), Carleton (Eden), Carr Bank
Carlisle
Cartmel, Cartmel Fell
Carwinley, Casterton, Castle Carrock, Castle Sowerby, Castletown
Cat Bank, Catlowdy, Catterlen, Causeway End
Causewayhead, Cautley, Chalkfoot
Chapel, Chapel Stile, Chapels, Chestnut Hill
Church Brough, Claife, Clappersgate, Clawthorpe, Cleabarrow
Cleator, Cleator Moor
Cliburn, Clifton, Clifton Dykes, Cockermouth
Cocklakes, Cockley Beck, Colby, Coldbeck
Colthouse, Colton, Common End
Coniston
Corby Hill, Corkickle, Corney, Cotehill, Cotes, Cotehill, Coulderton
Coupland, Cowen Head, Cowgill
Crackenthorpe, Croasdale, Crofton, Croglin, Crook, Crooklands
Crosby, Crosby Garrett, Crosby Ravensworth, Crosby Villa
Croslands Park, Cross End, Crosscanonby, Crossgates
Crosslands, Crosthwaite
Culgaith, Cumdivock, Cummersdale, Cumrew, Cumwhinton, Cumwhitton, Currock

D
Dacre, Dale, Dalemain
Dalston, Dalton, Dalton-in-Furness
Dean, Deanscales, Dearham, Deepthwaite, Dendron, Dent, Denton Holme, Distington, Dockray
Dovenby, Dragley Beck, Drigg, Drumburgh, Drumleaning, Drybeck
Dubwath, Duddon Bridge, Dufton, Dundraw
Dungeon Ghyll, Dunnerdale with Seathwaite, Durdar, Dykesfield

E
Eaglesfield, Eamont Bridge
East Curthwaite, Edderside, Edenhall
Egremont, Egton with Newland, Ellenborough
Ellonby, Elterwater, Embleton, Endmoor
Ennerdale Bridge
Eskdale, Eskdale Green, Eskett, Etterby, Ewanrigg

F
Fair Hill, Far Arnside, Far End, Far Sawrey
Farlam, Farleton, Faugh, Fawcett Forest, Fell Side, Fenton
Field Broughton, Fingland, Finsthwaite, Firbank
Flakebridge, Fletchertown, Flimby, Flitholme, Flookburgh, Floristonrigg
Force Forge, Forest Head, Fornside, Fothergill
Foulbridge, Foxfield, Frizington

G
Gaisgill, Galligill, Gamblesby, Gamelsby, Garlands
Garnett Bridge, Garrigill, Garsdale, Garsdale Head
Garth Row, Garths, Gatebeck, Gatefoot, Gatesgarth
Gawthrop, Gawthwaite, Geltsdale, Gilcrux, Gilsland
Glasson, Glasson, Glassonby, Glassonbybeck
Gleaston, Glencoyne, Glenridding, Goadsbarrow
Goodyhills, Goose Green, Gosforth
Grange Fell, Grange in Borrowdale, Grange-over-Sands
Grasmere, Grassgarth, Grayrigg, Grayson Green
Great Asby, Great Blencow, Great Broughton, Great Clifton
Great Corby, Great Crosthwaite, Great Langdale, Great Musgrave, Great Ormside
Great Orton, Great Salkeld, Great Strickland, Great Urswick
Green Bank, Green Head
Green Quarter, Greengill, Greenhill, Greenholme, Greenodd
Greenrow, Greenwell, Greysouthen
Greystoke, Greystone, Grinsdale, Grisedale, Grizebeck
Grizedale, Grizedale Forest, Gullom Holme

H
Hackthorpe, Haile, Hailforth, Hale
Halfpenny, Hall Dunnerdale, Hall Santon
Hall Waberthwaite, Hallbankgate, Hallbeck, Hallow Bank
Hallthwaites, Haltcliff Bridge
Hampsfield, Hardendale, Haresceugh
Harker, Harker Marsh, Harraby
Harrington, Harriston, Hartley, Hartsop, Hassness
Haverigg, Haverthwaite, Hawcoat, Hawksdale
Hawkshead, Hawkshead Hill, Haws Bank, Hayton, Hayton, Hayton and Mealo
Hazelrigg, Hazelslack, Heads Nook, Heaning
Heathwaite, Heggle Lane, Helbeck, Helvellyn, Helsington, Helton, Hensingham
Hesket, Hesket Newmarket, Hethersgill, Hetherside Heversham
High Bankhill, High Bewaldeth, High Biggins, High Casterton
High Crosby, High Cunsey, High Green, High Harrington, High Hesket
High Hill, High Ireby, High Knipe, High Longthwaite
High Lorton, High Newton, High Oaks, High Rigg
High Row, High Scales, High Side, High Wray, Highbridge, Highlaws
Highmoor, Hill Top, Hilton
Hincaster, Hodbarrow, Hoff, Holborn Hill, Hollins
Holker, Holme, Holme Abbey, Holme East Waver, Holme Low
Holme St Cuthbert, Holmrook, Holmwrangle, Honister Pass
Hopebeck, Hornsby, Houghton
How, Howgate, Howgill,  Howtown
Hubbersty Head, Hugill, Hunsonby, Hurst
Hutton, Hutton End, Hutton-in-the-Forest, Hutton John, Hutton Roof (Eden), Hutton Roof (South Lakeland), Hutton Soil, Hycemoor, Hyton

I-J
Ings, Ireby, Ireleth, Irthington
Isel, Isle of Walney, Ivegill, Johnby, Jericho

K
Kaber, Keekle, Keisley, Kelbarrow, Keld
Kelleth, Kells, Kelsick, Kelton Head, Kendal
Kentmere, Kentrigg, Kents Bank, Kershopefoot
Keswick
Killington, Kilnhill, Kingmoor, King's Meaburn
Kingside Hill, Kingstown, Kingwater, Kinkry Hill
Kirkandrews-on-Eden, Kirkbampton, Kirkbride
Kirkby-in-Furness, Kirkby Lonsdale, Kirkby Stephen, Kirkby Thore, Kirkcambeck
Kirkhouse, Kirkland (in Ennerdale), Kirkland (near Penrith), Kirkland Guards
Kirklinton, Kirklinton Middle, Kirkoswald
Kirksanton, Knock, Knowefield

L
Lady Hall, Laithes, Lakes 
Lakeside, Lambfoot, Lambrigg, Lamonby, Lamplugh
Lane End, Lanercost, Langdale, Langrigg, Langwathby
Laversdale, Lazonby, Leadgate, Leasgill, Leece
Legburthwaite, Lessonhall, Levens
Lindal-in-Furness, Lindale, Linstock
Little Asby, Little Bampton, Little Blencow, Little Broughton
Little Clifton, Little Corby, Little Crosthwaite, Little Langdale
Little Musgrave, Little Ormside, Little Orton, Little Salkeld
Little Strickland, Little Town, Little Urswick, Littlebeck
Lockhills, Long Marton, Longburgh, Longcroft
Longdales, Longlands, Longpark
Longsleddale, Longsowerby, Longthwaite, Longtown
Low Crosby, Low Harker, Low Hesket, Low Lorton, Low Wood
Lowca, Loweswater, Lowick, Lowther, Lupton

M
Mallerstang, Mansergh, Mansriggs, Martindale
Maryport, Matterdale End, Maughanby, Maulds Meaburn, Mawbray
Meal Bank, Mealsgate, Melkinthorpe, Melmerby, Metal Bridge
Micklethwaite, Middleton, Midgeholme, Milburn, Millom, Milnthorpe
Milton, Mockerkin, Monkhill, Moor Row, Moresby
Morland, Morton (Carlisle), Morton (Eden)
Mosedale, Mosser, Motherby
Muncaster, Mungrisdale, Murton

N
Nateby, Natland, Near Sawrey, Nenthall, Nenthead, Nethertown, Nether Wasdale
Newbiggin (Croglin), Newbiggin (Stainton), Newbiggin (Temple Sowerby), Newbiggin-on-Lune
New Cowper, Newby, Newby Bridge, Newby East, Newby West
New Hutton, Newland, Newlands, New Rent, Newton, Newton Arlosh
 Newton Reigny, Newton Rigg, Newtown, North Dykes, North Scale, Nunclose

O
Oddendale, Old Hutton, Old Town, Ormside, Orthwaite, Orton, Osmotherley
Oughterside, Oulton, Ousby, Outhgill, Oxen Park, Oxenholme

P
Papcastle, Park Broom, Parsonby, Parton, Patterdale
Pennington, Penrith, Penruddock, Pelutho
Petteril Green, Pica, Piel Island, Plumbland, Plumpton, Pokerbeck,
Ponsonby, Pooley Bridge, Port Carlisle, Portinscale, Preston Patrick, Prospect

Q
Quality Corner

R
Rampside, Ravenglass, Ravenstonedale, Raughton Head, Renwick
Rickerby, Roanhead, Rockcliffe, Rockcliffe Cross
Roose, Roosebeck, Rosley, Rosside, Rosthwaite (Allerdale)
Rosthwaite (South Lakeland), Rottington, Roundthwaite, Routenbeck, Rowrah
Ruckcroft, Ruleholme, Rusland, Ruthwaite, Rydal

S
Sadgill, St Bees, Salkeld Dykes, Salta, Sandale, Sandford, Santon Bridge, Satterthwaite
Scaleby, Scalebyhill, Scales (near Ulverston), Scales (near Threlkeld), Scotby
Seascale, Seathwaite (in the Duddon Valley), Seathwaite (in Borrowdale)
Seatoller, Seaton, Sebergham, Sedbergh, Sedgwick, Seldom Seen, Selside
Shap, Shoregill
Siddick, Silecroft, Silloth, Silverband
Skelton, Skelwith Bridge, Skinburness, Skirwith, Skitby
Slack Head
Smardale, Smithfield
Sockbridge, Soulby (near Dacre) Soulby (near Kirkby Stephen), Southwaite
Spark Bridge
Stainton (Eden), Stainton (South Lakeland), Stainton with Adgarley
Stair, Stanah, Stank, Stapleton, Staveley, Staveley-in-Cartmel
Stockdalewath, Stone House, Storrs, Storth, Stub Place, Studholme
Sunderland
Swallowhurst, Swarthmoor, Swindale, Swinside

T
Tallentire, Talkin, Tarraby, Tarns
Tebay, Temple Sowerby
 Thiefside, Thornhill, Thornthwaite (Keswick), Thornthwaite (Wigton), Threapland, Threlkeld, Thursby, Thurstonfield, Thurstonfield Lough, Thwaites
Tirril
Todhills, Torpenhow, Torver
Troutbeck (near Penrith), Troutbeck (near Windermere), Troutbeck Bridge

U
Uldale, Ulpha, Ulverston, Underbarrow, Underskiddaw
Unthank (near Dalston), Unthank (near Glassonby), Unthank End
Upper Denton, Upton, Urswick

V
Vickerstown

W
Waberthwaite, Walton, Warcop, Warnell, Warwick Bridge, Warwick-on-Eden
Wasdale, Wasdale Head, Watchgate, Watendlath, Watermillock, Waverbridge, Waverton
Welton, Wet Sleddale, Westnewton, Westward, Wetheral
Whale, Whicham, Whitehaven
Wiggonby, Wigton, Wilton
 Winder, Windermere, Winscales, Winster
Winton, Witherslack, Wolsty, Woodend, Woodend
Woodland, Workington, Wreay, Wythburn, Wythop Mill

Y
Yanwath, Yarlside, Yearngill

See also
List of places in England

 
Cumbria
Places